The Battle of Derna, also known as the Battle of Sidi Abdullah (Arabic: معركة سيدي عبد الله), occurred near Derna on 3 March 1912, during the Italo-Turkish War. The battle took place between the Italians led by Luigi Capello and Ottoman-Senussi Forces led by Enver Pasha and Ahmed Sharif as-Senussi.

Citations

References

 
 
 

Derna 1912
1912 in the Ottoman Empire
March 1912 events
Conflicts in 1912
Derna, Libya
Battles of Mustafa Kemal Atatürk